Våraskruv Nature Reserve is a nature reserve in Kronoberg County, Sweden.

The nature reserve protects an area of still maintained old-fashioned meadows and tended fields. Several large oaks grow in the area and support a variety of insects and birds. The nature reserve also includes a lake (Lake Våraskruv). For the convenience of visitors, footpaths have been prepared in the nature reserve.

References

Nature reserves in Sweden
Geography of Kronoberg County